Roto-Limbs is a studio album by the free improvisation ensemble Mnemonist Orchestra, issued as a limited edition, cassette-only release in 1981 by Dys Records.

Track listing

Personnel 
Adapted from the Roto-Limbs liner notes.
Mnemonists
 Mark Derbyshire – instruments
 Steve Emmons – instruments
 Rolf Goranson – instruments
 Steve Scholbe – instruments
 William Sharp – instruments

Release history

References

External links 
 Roto-Limbs at Discogs (list of releases)

1981 albums
Biota (band) albums